Thodoros Kefalopoulos (1894–1987) was a Greek actor.

Biography

He was born in Vryoula near Smyrna (mod. Izmir) in Asia Minor in the Ottoman Empire. His first screen appearance was in 1915. Hebecame a member of the Hellenic Actor's Guild a few months after its foundation in 1917. He participated chiefly in roving theatrical troupes, playing all kinds of roles (drama, comedy, burlesque, etc.). He founded a number of troupes himself, touring tall of Greece along with his wife, Sofia Kefalopoulou (1984-19??). Near the end of his career, in the 1960s, he also landed minor roles in a number of movies. He was also a member of the management board of the Actors' Mutual Assistance Fund. He died in 1987 in Athens.

Filmography

1894 births
1987 deaths
Greek male film actors
Smyrniote Greeks
Emigrants from the Ottoman Empire to Greece
Actors from İzmir